Hughie Morrison is a British racehorse trainer who specialises in training horses competing in Flat racing.

Morrison is the son of James Morrison, 2nd Baron Margadale, and was educated at Eton College. He was advised by the trainer Henry Cecil to see life outside racing before training and initially worked in the pharmaceutical industry and ran a lighting company in Manchester.

He began training horses in 1997 having bought a stable at East Ilsley the previous September, after a two-year period as assistant trainer to Paul Cole. His first major success came in National Hunt racing but he has subsequently concentrated on Flat racing.

In February 2022, Morrison trained his 1000th winner.

Major wins
 Great Britain
 July Cup - (2) -  Pastoral Pursuits (2005), Sakhee's Secret (2007) 
 Fighting Fifth Hurdle - (1) -  Not So Sleepy (dead heat 2021) 

 France
 Prix Royal-Oak - (1)  Alcazar (2005)

References

External links 
Official website

Living people
British racehorse trainers
Hughie
People educated at Eton College
Younger sons of barons
Year of birth missing (living people)